The White Plague is a 1982 science fiction novel by  American author, Frank Herbert that explores madness and revenge on a global scale.

Plot

On May 20, 1996, an IRA terrorist car bomb explodes, killing the wife and children of molecular biologist John Roe O'Neill. Driven halfway insane by his loss, his mind fragments into several personalities that carry out his plan for him. O'Neill plans a gendercidal revenge and creates a plague that kills only women, but for which men are the carriers. O'Neill then releases it in Ireland (for supporting the IRA), England (for their actions in Ireland and giving the IRA a cause), and Libya (for training said terrorists); he demands that the governments of the world send all citizens of those countries back to their countries, and that they quarantine those countries and let the plague run its course, so they will lose what he has lost; if they do not, he has more plagues to release.

After releasing the plague, O'Neill goes to Ireland to hide, planning to offer his services as a molecular biologist in the hopes of sabotaging whatever work is done there on finding a cure. When he arrives in Ireland, he is suspected of being O'Neill (whom the investigatory agencies of the world have deduced is responsible). To travel to the lab at Killaloe, he is forced to walk with a priest, a boy who has taken a vow of silence due to the death of his mother, and Joseph Herity, the IRA bomber who detonated the explosive that killed O'Neill's wife and children; their purpose is to confirm his identity, either through Herity's indirect questioning, or the possibility that he will confess to the priest when confronted with the pain his revenge has caused for the boy.

Meanwhile, law and order have broken down in England and Ireland, and the old Irish ways are coming back.  Local IRA thugs appoint themselves "kings of old", and others recreate ancient Celtic religions centered on the rowan tree. The IRA has effective control of Ireland, but as the governments of the world grow certain that O'Neill is there and essentially in custody, they consider wiping out the three targeted countries to end the lingering threat.

Major themes
Most of the drama is mental, political, and communal.  While the story of O'Neill and his revenge is told in full, there is also the larger story of how the governments of the world's countries deal with the plague, which escapes into limited areas that are quickly sterilized by "panic fire", which immolates everything and everyone in it. North Africa is wiped out; Boston is burned to the ground; Rome is destroyed with atomic bombs; and the US pushes for a moat of cobalt dust to isolate Africa, which is written off as a total loss.

The world's armed forces are reorganized under a Canadian Admiral, Francois Delacourt, who heads Barrier Command, responsible for the absolute separation of contaminated and clean areas.  Scientists toy with a conspiracy of intellectuals to override the expected repression of research by governments.  In countries around the world, angry mobs lynch Irish, English, Libyans, and anyone too closely resembling them.

The plague also has major social repercussions.  The book implies near the end that polyandry will necessarily become mandatory, potentially giving women involved in such marriages enhanced power.

Reception
Dave Langford reviewed The White Plague for White Dwarf #41, and stated that "There's plenty of edge-of-the-seat suspense and good thumping melodrama in the race to crack the gene-structure of the plague while a few women are still left alive."

Awards
The White Plague was nominated for a Locus Award for best science fiction novel in 1983, but lost to Isaac Asimov's novel Foundation's Edge.

References 

1982 American novels
American science fiction novels
Novels by Frank Herbert
Fictional diseases and disorders
Fiction set in 1996
Bioterrorism in fiction
Novels set in the future